Lydia Mitcham Meredith (May 3, 1952) is an author and the former CEO of the Renaissance Learning Center (RLC) in Atlanta, Georgia, from Macon, Georgia. Meredith is a community organizer, entrepreneur and civil rights activist formerly operated an early childhood development center in downtown Atlanta, Georgia.

Meredith led the daily operations of the Renaissance Learning Center (RLC) operating in the 4th Ward community of Atlanta, Georgia. Ninety-five percent of the students assisted by the Renaissance Learning Center were from impoverished homes. Teen Talk, a program within their curriculum, educated over 2,000 teenagers on life skills. The RLC graduated over 3,000 students into kindergarten. The RLC successfully assisted 2,500 school-age children get promoted to the next grade with 100% of them going on to high school. Five hundred children and adults are impacted daily by the RLC. Fifteen thousand families were elevated out of poverty because of services rendered to them by the Renaissance Learning Center.
She was acknowledged for her work in the community by former governor of Georgia Roy Barnes. The RLC was presented with the Childhood Hero Award for the service rendered to the youth of the community.

Early life and education 
Meredith is the fifth of thirteen children born to Wilbur Mitcham and Annie M. Mitcham. She is the author of the novel The Gay Preacher's Wife.

 
Meredith was one of the first Black students to integrate the all-white Lasseter High School in Macon, Georgia. She had the distinction of being the first cheerleader for Mark Smith High School, their all-white male counterpart. Meredith graduated from Lasseter High School with honors and was accepted at Vanderbilt University in 1970 and graduated with a BS in industrial engineering. She has the distinction of being Vanderbilt University's first cheerleader of African American descent in 1972.

Meredith earned her MBA from Vanderbilt's Owen Graduate School of Management. Additionally, she holds master's degrees in Christian education and public policy from the Morehouse School of Religion and Georgia State University-Andrew Young School of Policy Studies respectively.

References

External links 
"The Gay Preacher's Wife" 
"Tom Joyner Morning Show"
"Lydia M. Mitcham
"Community Activist"
"Master Plan"

1952 births
Living people
People from Macon, Georgia
Interdenominational Theological Center alumni
Vanderbilt University alumni
African-American novelists
American women novelists
21st-century American novelists
American industrial engineers
African-American women engineers
American women engineers
African-American engineers
20th-century American engineers
21st-century American engineers
American women chief executives
Businesspeople from Atlanta
21st-century American businesspeople
20th-century American businesspeople
20th-century American businesswomen
African-American business executives
20th-century women engineers
21st-century women engineers
21st-century American women writers
20th-century American women writers
21st-century American businesswomen